Nili was a spy network.

Nili may also refer to:

Places 
Nili District, Afghanistan
Nili, Afghanistan, the district's capital city
Nili Airport
Nili, Iran, a village
Nili, Mateh Binyamin, an Israeli settlement in the West Bank
Nili Tower, Dubai, United Arab Emirates

People 
 Nili Abramski (born 1970), Israeli Olympic runner
 Nili Block (born 1995), Israeli kickboxer
 Nili Brosh (born 1988), Israeli guitarist
 Nili Cohen (born 1947), Israeli legal scholar
 Nili Drori (born 1960), Israeli Olympic fencer
 Nili Rachel Scharf Gold (born 1948), Israeli-American professor of Hebrew literature
 Nili Hadida, Israeli musician and member of Lilly Wood and the Prick
 Nili Latu (born 1982), Tongan rugby player
 Nilli Lavie, Israeli-British psychologist
 Nili Lotan, Israeli fashion designer
 Nili Natkho (1982–2004), Israeli basketball player
 Nili Ohayon, stage name Onili, Israeli singer-songwriter
 Nili Tal (born 1944), Israeli journalist and documentary filmmaker
 Nili (footballer), Spanish footballer Francisco José Perdomo Borges (born 1994)
 Muhammad Hussain Sadiqi Nili (1940–1990), jihadist leader in Afghanistan
 Nasrullah Sadiqi Zada Nili (born 1966), Afghan politician

Other uses 
 Nili (subgroup), in the Taxonomy of Anopheles

See also 
 Nilly Drucker, Miss Israel 1986

Hebrew feminine given names